Laura Unsworth,  (born 8 March 1988) is an English field hockey player who plays as a midfielder or defender for East Grinstead and the England and Great Britain national teams.

She is the first British field hockey player to win three Olympic medals. 

Unsworth attended Coppice Primary School, Sutton Coldfield Grammar School for Girls and Loughborough University.

Club career

Unsworth plays club hockey in the Women's England Hockey League Premier Division for East Grinstead.

She has also played for Holcombe, Loughborough Students and Sutton Coldfield.

International career

Unsworth made her international debut in 2008 and was part of the Great Britain teams that won the gold medal at the 2016 Olympics and bronze medals at the 2012 and 2020 Summer Olympics.

Unsworth has also competed for England at the European Championships winning three bronze, one silver and a Gold medal, won in London in 2015. She also competed for England at the Commonwealth Games, securing bronze and silver at the 2010 and 2014.

References

External links 
 
 

1988 births
Living people
English female field hockey players
Field hockey players at the 2012 Summer Olympics
Olympic field hockey players of Great Britain
Olympic medalists in field hockey
Olympic bronze medallists for Great Britain
Medalists at the 2012 Summer Olympics
Field hockey players at the 2014 Commonwealth Games
Alumni of Loughborough University
Loughborough Students field hockey players
Commonwealth Games silver medallists for England
Commonwealth Games bronze medallists for England
Medalists at the 2016 Summer Olympics
Olympic gold medallists for Great Britain
Field hockey players at the 2016 Summer Olympics
Field hockey players at the 2020 Summer Olympics
Commonwealth Games medallists in field hockey
Members of the Order of the British Empire
People educated at Sutton Coldfield Grammar School for Girls
Sportspeople from Sutton Coldfield
Field hockey players at the 2018 Commonwealth Games
Female field hockey defenders
Holcombe Hockey Club players
East Grinstead Hockey Club players
Women's England Hockey League players
Medalists at the 2020 Summer Olympics
Medallists at the 2014 Commonwealth Games
Medallists at the 2018 Commonwealth Games